Imandra (Russian: Имандра, Finnish: Imantero) is a lake in the south-western part of the Kola Peninsula in Murmansk Oblast, Russia, slightly beyond the Arctic circle. It is located 127 m above sea level; its area is about 876 km2, maximum depth is 67 m. The shape of the shore line is complicated. There are a number of islands and the largest one, Erm Island measures 26 km2. There are three principal parts of the lake connected by narrow straits: Greater Imandra (Большая Имандра) or Khibinskaya Imandra in the north (area 328 km2, length about 55 km, width 3–5 km), Ekostrovskaya Imandra in the centre (area 351 km2), and Babinskaya Imandra in the west (area 133 km2). The lake drains into the Kandalaksha Gulf of the White Sea by the Niva River. The lake is known for the transparency of its water and its abundance of fish.

Towns on or near the lake
The town of Monchegorsk, located on the Monche-Guba inlet in the north-western part of the lake, is known as a centre of winter sports. During the summer, many residents enjoy boating on the lake, while in winter the frozen lake is popular with cross-country skiers.

Apatity is located near the eastern shore of the lake, and Polyarnye Zori are on the Niva River a few kilometers below its outflow from the lake.

Navigation 
Presently, Lake Imandra is only used by local residents for recreational boating.

However, for several years in the 1930s, before the railway branch between Monchegorsk and the Leningrad-Murmansk mainline was built, Monchegorsk was connected to the rest of the country in summer by boat across Lake Imandra. Ferries from Monchegorsk would dock in Tik-Guba (today's Apatity), on the main rail line.

Notes

Imandra
Niva basin